Gandaki Province ), is one of the seven federal provinces established by the current constitution of Nepal which was promulgated on 20 September 2015. Pokhara is the province's capital city. It borders the Tibet Autonomous Region of China to the north, Bagmati Province to the east, Karnali Province to the west, and Lumbini Province and Bihar of India to the south. The total area of the province is 21,504 km2 - about 14.57% of the country's total area. According to the latest census, the population of the province was 2,479,745. The newly elected Provincial Assembly adopted Gandaki Province as the permanent name by replacing its initial name Province no. 4 in July 2018. Krishna Chandra Nepali is the present chief minister of Gandaki Province.

Etymology

Gandaki Province was named after the river Gandaki. Gandaki is a major river in the province. This river has Important links with historical Hindu civilization. The Gandaki river is mentioned in the ancient Sanskrit epic Mahabharata. It has been said that Valmiki wrote the great epic Ramayana here. It is also believed to be the birthplace of Luv & Kush. Its evolution is described in Shiva Purana, Kumarakhand, in the chapter of the killing of Shankhachuda.

History

Gandaki province was once home to the Chaubisi Rajya, the 24 kings, of which Gorkha was one. From Gorkha, Prithvi Narayan Shah arose to unify all the kingdoms and expand to include all of present-day Nepal. Gandaki Province was known as "Gandak Kshetra" which was established in 1956. Gandak Kshetra was composed by grouping the then 4 districts. Those 4 districts are now divided into many districts. The four districts were:
 Lumbini District (Rupandehi, Parasi, Palpa)
 Syangja District (Syangja, Nawalpur)
 Pokhara District (Tanahun, Kaski)
 Gorkha District (Gorkha, Lamjung, Manang)

In 1962, the administrative system was restructured again and the "Kshetras" system was canceled. The country was restructured into 75 development districts and those districts were grouped into zones. In 1972 area of the Gandaki Province named Western Development Region. It had 3 zones and 16 districts.

Geography 
The province has an area of 21,773 km2 which is about 14.66% of the total area of Nepal. The state extends between 27°-20' N ~ 29°-20' N latitude and 82° 52' E ~ 85°-12' E longitude. In terms of terrain, the province is spread over the Himalayan, Hilly and Terai region of Nepal; 5,919 km2 (26.8%) of the area falls under the Himalayan region, 14,604 km2 (67.2%) of the area falls under the Hilly region and 1,310 km2 (6%) of the area falls under the Terai region.

Demographics 

The province has a population of 2,403,016 which is just about 9.06% of the total population of Nepal. The population density is about 110 persons per square kilometre. The province has a population growth rate of -0.33%. The sex ratio is 89 males for 100 females, with a total of 948,028 males and 1,144,124 females recorded in 2011. The urban population of the region is 1,452,186 (60.5%) and the rural population is 943,652 (39.5%). About 50.1% of the population in the province are independent population.

Ethnicity 

Hill Brahmins are the largest community with 21.26% of the population. Other aboriginal Khas communities include Khas/Chhetri (13.13%), Kami (8.66%), Sarki (4.10%), Damai (3.84%), Thakuri (1.61%) and Kumal (1.49%). The Janajati groups are Magar (18.79%), Gurung (11.30%), Newar (4.23%), Tamang (2.03%), Tharu (1.68%) and Bhujel (1.27%).

Language

According to the 2011 Nepal census there are total 88 languages spoken in Gandaki Province. Nepali/Gorkhali/Khas Kura is the most-spoken language, by 72.67% of the population. 9.85% speak Kham Magar, 8.70% Gurung, 1.72% Newar, 1.48% Tharu and 1.42% Tamang.

The Language Commission of Nepal has recommended Magar, Gurung and Bhojpuri as official language in the province. The commission has also recommended Tharu, Nepal Bhasa and Tamang to be additional official languages, for specific regions and purposes in the province.

Administrative subdivisions 

Gandaki province is divided into 11 districts, which are listed below. A district is administrated by the head of the District Coordination Committee and the District Administration Officer. The districts are further divided into municipalities or rural municipalities. The municipalities include one metropolitan city and 26 municipalities. There are 58 rural municipalities in the province.

 Baglung District
 Gorkha District
 Kaski District
 Lamjung District
 Manang District
 Mustang District
 Myagdi District
 Nawalpur District
 Parbat District
 Syangja District
 Tanahun District

Government and administration 

The Governor acts as the head of the province while the Chief Minister is the head of the provincial government. The Chief Judge of the Pokhara High Court is the head of the judiciary. The present Governor, Chief Minister and Chief Judge are Sita Kumari Poudel (governor), Krishna Chandra Nepali Pokharel (chief minister) and Purushottam Bhandari. The province has 60 provincial assembly constituencies and 18 federal House of Representative constituencies.

Gandaki Province has a unicameral legislature, like that of the other provinces in Nepal. The tenure of the provincial assembly is of five years. The Provincial Assembly of Gandaki Province is temporarily housed at the Urban Development Training Centre in Pokhara.

Economy 
The economy of the province is largely dependent on tourism.

Infrastructure

Roadways 
9 out of 11 districts of Gandaki Province are connected via surfaced roads. Road connections to Mustang and Manang are unsurfaced and can be impassable during the rainy season. Siddhartha Highway connects Lumbini to Gandaki. The highway starts at the Nepal-India Border in Siddharthanagar and terminates at Prithivi chowk, Pokhara. The major settlements on the highway are Siddharthanagar, Butwal, Tansen, Waling, Putalibazar, Syangja, and Pokhara.

Airways 

Pokhara International Airport is an international airport that serves the province.

See also 

Provinces of Nepal
List of districts in Nepal

References

 
Provinces of Nepal
2015 establishments in Nepal
States and territories established in 2015